Inside Out may refer to:

Backwards (disambiguation) or inverse

Books
 Inside Out: A Personal History of Pink Floyd, by Pink Floyd drummer Nick Mason
 Inside Out, Christian book by Larry Crabb
 Inside Out, novel by Barry Eisler
 Inside Out & Back Again, children's book by Thanhha Lai
 Inside Out, novel by Ann M. Martin
 Inside Out, 2016 novel by Maria V. Snyder
 Inside Out: Straight Talk from a Gay Jock, 2006 autobiography by Mark Tewksbury
 Inside Out (Moore book), a 2019 memoir by actress Demi Moore
 Inside Out, 2003 novel by Terry Trueman

Film
 Inside Out (1975 film), a comedy thriller starring Telly Savalas and James Mason
 Inside Out (1986 film), by Robert Taicher about a man suffering from agoraphobia, starring Elliott Gould
 Inside/Out (film), a 1997 American drama directed by Rob Tregenza
 Inside Out (2005 film), a thriller starring Eriq La Salle and Steven Weber
 Inside Out (2011 film), starring Triple H
 Inside Out (2015 film), a computer-animated film by Pixar

Television
 Inside Out (2000 TV series), a Scottish children's series
 Inside Out (2002 TV programme), a BBC series
 Inside/Out (American TV series), broadcast on PBS during the 1970s to teach children about social issues
 "Inside Out" (Angel), a 2003 episode of the television series Angel
 "Inside Out" (CSI: Miami), episode 123 of the television series CSI: Miami
 "Inside Out" (The Unit), an episode of the television series The Unit
 Inside Out (Singaporean TV series), a current affairs program that was broadcast on SPH MediaWorks Channel U
 Inside Out, a promotional documentary about singer Chris Willis 2010
 "Inside Out" (2 Stupid Dogs), an episode of 2 Stupid Dogs

Music

Albums
 Inside Out (Anthrax EP), 1999
 Inside Out (Philip Bailey album), 1986
 Inside Out (Bon Jovi album), 2012
 In Side Out, a 1972 album by Edgar Broughton Band
 Inside Out (Cam Clarke album), 1999
 Inside Out (Catherine album), 2009
 Inside Out (Chick Corea album), 1990
 Inside Out (Culture Beat album), 1995
 Inside Out (Bobby Darin album)
 Inside Out (Kat DeLuna album), 2010
 Inside Out (Dilana album), 2009
 Inside Out (Dive album), 1993
 Inside Out (Fates Warning album), 1994
 Inside Out (The Flock album), 1975
 Inside Out (Lee Greenwood album), 1982
 Inside Out (Eddie Henderson album), 1974
 Inside Out (Keith Jarrett album), 2001
 Inside Out (Charlie Major album), 2004
 Inside Out (John Martyn album), 1973
 Inside Out (MC Hammer album), 1995
 Inside Out (Joe McPhee album), 1996
 Inside Out (Sue Medley album), 1992
 Inside Out (Emmy Rossum album), 2007
 Inside Out, 2003, by Nate Sallie
 Inside Out (Trisha Yearwood album), 2001
 Inside Out (XXI album), 2015

Songs
 "Inside Out" (Anthrax song), 1998
 "Inside Out" (Avalanche City song), 2015
 "Inside Out" (Britney Spears song), 2011
 "Inside Out" (Bryan Adams song), 1998
 "Inside Out" (Camila Cabello song), 2018
 "Inside Out" (Chainsmokers song), 2016
 "Inside Out" (Culture Beat song), 1995
 "Inside Out" (Eve 6 song), 1998
 "Inside Out" (Five Finger Death Punch song), 2019
 "Inside Out" (Imelda May song), 2011
 "Inside Out" (Into a Circle song), 1986
 "Inside Out" (Odyssey song), 1982
 "Inside Out" (Shara Nelson song), 1993
 "Inside Out" (Soulhead song), Batti Baas' second single
 "Inside Out" (Traveling Wilburys song), 1990
 "Inside Out" (Vonray song), 2003
 "Inside Out" (Zedd and Griff song), 2020
 "Inside Out", a 2008 song by Cadia
 "Inside Out", a Cause and Effect song from the 1994 album Trip
 "Inside Out", a Crash Vegas song from the 1989 album Red Earth
 "Inside Out", a Duster song from the 1998 album Stratosphere
 "Inside Out", a 1980 song by Gentle Giant from Civilian
 "Inside Out", a Madonna song from the 2015 album Rebel Heart
 "Inside Out", a Mighty Lemon Drops song from the 1988 album World Without End
 "Inside Out", a Phil Collins song from the 1985 album No Jacket Required
 "Inside Out", a Spoon song from the 2014 album They Want My Soul
 "Inside Out", a Warrant song from the 1992 album Dog Eat Dog
 "Inside Out", an XYZ song from the 1989 album XYZ

Other music
Inside Out (musical), a 1994 Off-Broadway musical by Adryan Russ
Inside Out Music, a record label specialising in progressive rock and progressive metal
Inside Out (band), a late 1980s band
Insideout, a 1990s Israeli Euro House duo
Inside Out, a former name of the Christian rock band PFR

Other uses
 Inside Out Film and Video Festival, a non-profit LGBT film organization
 Inside-Out Prison Exchange Program, a national program based in Philadelphia at Temple University
 Inside Out, a juggling manoeuvre, a variant on the Mills Mess juggling pattern

See also
Eversion (disambiguation)
Inside (disambiguation)
Outside In (disambiguation)